Sita Menon is a former journalist and a Film Editor with Rediff.com, who started her writing career with directors Raj Nidimoru and Krishna DK.

Career 
She has worked along with filmmakers Raj Nidimoru and Krishna DK, as their writing partner, creative producer and creative partner on various movies including their debut movie 99,starring Kunal Khemu, Boman Irani, Soha Ali Khan.

Menon continued working with the duo, as a writer for Shor in the City, Go Goa Gone, Happy Ending and A Gentleman. 

She is currently working on Reloaded with Jacqueline Fernandez playing the lead role.

Scriptwriter

References

External links 
 

Living people
21st-century Indian women artists
Indian women screenwriters
Year of birth missing (living people)